Denebola may refer to:

Denebola (β Leo, β Leonis, Beta Leonis), the third-brightest star in the constellation Leo
Denebola brachycephala, an extinct whale

Ships
 , a German-built British cargo steam ship, 1899–1918
 , an Algol-class vehicle cargo ship currently maintained by the United States Maritime Administration
 , was an Altair-class destroyer tender of the US Navy
 , was a Denebola-class stores ship of the US Navy